Castlewood, also known as the Poindexter House and The Old Parsonage, is a historic plantation house located near Chesterfield, Chesterfield County, Virginia.  It was built between about 1810 and 1820, and is a long, five-part frame house that was built in at least two or three stages.  It consists of a two-story, one-bay-wide central section, flanked by -story, two-bay wings, connected to the main block by one-story, one-bay hyphens.  Also on the property is a contributing frame, pyramidal roofed structure with a coved cornice that may have housed a dairy.

It was listed on the National Register of Historic Places in 1976.

References

Plantation houses in Virginia
Houses on the National Register of Historic Places in Virginia
Houses completed in 1820
Houses in Chesterfield County, Virginia
National Register of Historic Places in Chesterfield County, Virginia
Clergy houses in the United States